The 1894 Amherst football team represented Amherst College as a member of the Triangular Football League during the 1894 college football season. Amherst compiled an overall record of 7–5–1 with a mark of 0–2 in TFL play, finished last out of the three teams in the league. One of the sport's best known historians, Parke H. Davis, was coach of the team.

Schedule

References

Amherst
Amherst Mammoths football seasons
Amherst football